The smallscale mud carp (Cirrhinus microlepis) is a species of ray-finned fish in the genus Cirrhinus.

References

External links
 

Cirrhinus
Fish of Thailand
Fish described in 1878